Kang Kuk-chol is the name of:

Kang Kuk-chol (footballer, born 1988)
Kang Kuk-chol (footballer, born 1990)
Kang Kuk-chol (footballer, born 1999)